"" (French for "As usual") is a French song about routine in a relationship falling out of love, composed in 1967 by Jacques Revaux, with lyrics by Claude François and .

In 1968 the song was adapted by David Bowie and given new lyrics to create the song "Even a Fool Learns to Love". Paul Anka again give it new lyrics to create the song that became "My Way", Frank Sinatra's signature song. Another derivative by David Bowie, Life on Mars?, was released in 1971.

Original
In February 1967 Jacques Revaux, on holiday in the Hôtel Canada in Megève, realised that he was overdue to write four songs commissioned by producer , and wrote them all in one morning. One titled "For Me" had English lyrics; it was refused by Michel Sardou, Mireille Mathieu, Hugues Aufray and Claude François before Hervé Vilard released a version as a B-side. Revaux was dissatisfied and visited François at Dannemois on 27 August 1967 proposing to rework the song for him.  François accepted but asked that an underlying theme of a couple in a strained relationship be included, in reference to his recent breakup with fellow French singer France Gall. Revaux agreed and with some rewriting from Gilles Thibaut the song became "Comme d'habitude" in its best-known version in French, which was released by Claude François in 1968.

Cover versions
Many artists sang "Comme d'Habitude" in French after Claude François's success (and international success through '"My Way"), notably:

 Michel Pagliaro, from Montreal (QC) in Canada, recorded Comme d’habitude on label DSP in March 1968.
Michel Sardou, who had refused the first version of the song offered to him by Claude François and Jacques Revaux but sang it a bit slower and re-orchestrated. 
Florent Pagny covered the song in 1989 and released as a single in France. It charted #6 in France.
Jason Kouchak covered and arranged a modern version in 2011.
Rachid Taha, Khaled and Faudel, three French-Algerian artists sang it live in Palais Omnisports de Paris-Bercy. The live version produced and arranged by Steve Hillage, was included in joint Taha / Khaled / Faudel live album 1, 2, 3 Soleils was released by Barclay in 1999 reaching No. 4 in French Albums Chart and No. 14 in Belgium's French (Wallonia) Albums Chart. The cover of "Comme d'habitude" found on the album as performed by the trio proved very popular and was released in 1999 as a single in France and it reached No. 40 on both SNEP, the official French Singles Chart and on Belgium's French Wallonia Singles Chart.
Nina Hagen covered the song in the late 1970s.
Singers of musical Belles belles belles covered the song in 2003.
M. Pokora, in collaboration with Claude François Jr., covered this song, as well as some other Claude François songs, for his album My Way.

Translations
Miro Ungar covered the song in 1968 in Croatian, "Ko svakog dana", released on 7" vinyl "Ako izgubim glavu" (Jugoton, EPY-3968)
Peter Jöback covered the song in 2011 in Swedish "Precis som vanligt"
 Raymond van het Groenewoud made a Dutch translation to the original songtext named "Zoals Gewoonlijk", it was released on August 30, 2004.

Adaptations
Besides translations more or less faithful to the original, some artists have set unrelated lyrics to the same tune.
Jozsef Gregor the renowned Hungarian bass-baritone/basso buffo recorded the song with Andras Ruszanov's Hungarian love themed lyrics version in 1996. Two years later, he sang this version in one of the most popular TV show in Budapest, since then this version has been permanently on the playlists of numerous radio stations in Hungary.

"My Way"

Paul Anka, after hearing the song while listening to French radio, bought the song's publication and adaptation rights but the original songwriters retained the music-composition half of their songwriter royalties. Anka wrote English lyrics specifically for Frank Sinatra, who then recorded a cross-Atlantic version of it in 1969 under the title "My Way". "My Way" has since been covered by many artists.

The lyrics of "My Way" are similar to those of "Comme d'habitude" in terms of structure and metre, but the meaning is completely different. The French song is about routine in a relationship that is falling out of love, while the English language version is set at the end of a lifetime, approaching death, and looking back without regret – expressing feelings that are more related to Edith Piaf's song "Non, je ne regrette rien".

Others
 André Hazes in 1980 released a version with new Dutch lyrics, titled "Waarom" ('Why?').
 Gipsy Kings on their eponymous 1987 album included a Spanish version; although the title "A Mi Manera" translates to "My Way", the love-themed lyrics are more reminiscent of the Claude François song.
 The screenplay for Superman IV called for a Russian cosmonaut to sing a Russian version of "My Way", but the music supervisor realised that commissioning original Russian lyrics for Revaux' tune would cost much less than acquiring translation rights to Anka's lyrics, and that non-Russophone audiences would not notice the difference.
 David Bowie said that in 1968 – the year before Paul Anka acquired the French song – his publisher asked him to write English lyrics for "Comme d'habitude" but that his version, titled "Even a Fool Learns to Love", was rejected. The unfinished work would later inspire his 1971 song "Life on Mars?".

References

 Claude François – Comme d’habitude, Zicabloc, 20 January 2011 (in French)

External links
 Lyrics to "Comme d'habitude" and "My Way" in different languages

1967 songs
French-language songs
Songs with music by Claude François
Songs written by Gilles Thibaut
Songs written by Jacques Revaux